The Senior CLASS Award was presented each year to the outstanding senior NCAA Division I Student-Athlete of the Year in men's soccer.  The award was established in 2007, but was discontinued in 2021.

References

External links
 Official site

College soccer trophies and awards in the United States
Student athlete awards in the United States